Bethsaida Community Foundation is a community-based refuge in Kenya for the less fortunate, the orphaned and vulnerable people. It was established in 2011. The centre is built with mud on a piece of land bought by Hika Kamau. It offers parental love, spiritual care, rehabilitation and formal education to these children, with the aim of naturing their potential and personal capacity through other myriad of activities such as non-formal learning. The foundation began as a structural project in 2009 to house and rehabilitate street children, orphans and vulnerable children.

This however, did not stop an additional 16 children to seek refuge and education (a total of 30 in 2011). As of 2014, the school offered basic education to 91 pupils (47 boys & 44 girls).

The school's teacher base is stretched to capacity comprising 7 teachers (4 gents and 3 ladies). Volunteer teachers supplement the teachers during university holidays.

The school is supported by donors. Despite the challenges, the school has managed to nature academic excellence, sports, music and acting talents, a testament of the many accolades in then Director's office.

References 
 http://www.besahemi.org/

Special schools in Kenya
2011 establishments in Kenya
Educational institutions established in 2011
Schools in Nairobi